Echinostrephus molaris is a species of echinoderms belonging to the family Echinometridae.

The species is found in Indian and Pacific Ocean.

References

Echinometridae